Knockraha is a small village in east County Cork, Ireland.

It is within the Dáil constituency of Cork East.

History
The name Knockraha means "fort (rath) hill" or "hill of the forts". This refers to a collection of forts that stood on a hill (known locally as Carthy's Hill) between Knockraha East and Knockraha West.

Knockraha is within the Roman Catholic parish of Glounthaune, which was formed in the late 19th century with the amalgamation of the historical ecclesiastical parishes of Ballylucra, Ballyvinney, Caherlag, Killaspugmillane and Kilquane. The latter parish of Kilquane stretched from Glenmore Bridge to Watergrasshill village and was centred on the church in what is now Kilquane Cemetery. Tradition holds that Saint Cuan founded Kilquane, which means 'church of Cuán', and there are several other Kilquanes elsewhere in Munster. Cuan was possibly a passing missionary, like Saint Patrick, who brought Christianity to the area.

Interconnector from France
The Celtic Interconnector is a planned interconnector between the substation at Knockraha and Finistère in north-west France. As of November 2022, the project was planned for completion by 2026.

References

External links
 The story of the notorious Cork jail Sing Sing, TheJournal.ie, 2016

Towns and villages in County Cork